The M90 is a motorway in Scotland. It runs from Junction 1A of the M9 motorway, south of the Queensferry Crossing, to Perth.  It is the northernmost motorway in the United Kingdom. The northern point goes to the western suburbs of Perth at Broxden. A small part of the M90 (across the Friarton Bridge to the southeast of Perth) was originally numbered as the M85 motorway.

History
The first section of the M90 opened in 1964 to coincide with the opening of the Forth Road Bridge and Masterton junction (Junction 2). The next section of the M90, the Crossgates – Kelty and Cowdenbeath Bypass, opened on 1 December 1969. The stretch between Kinross and the Milnathort Bypass opened in December 1971.

Two sections were due to begin construction around 1973 and 1974, however, they were put on hold because of the 1973 oil crisis. The section from Arlary (Junction 8 with A91) to Arngask was opened in March 1977. Arngask (Glenfarg) to Muirmont opened in August 1980, connecting with the completed Friarton Bridge (which was originally numbered M85, and opened in 1976) and Perth Bypass to Broxden.

The M90 was extended southwards across the Firth of Forth over a new cable-stayed bridge, the Queensferry Crossing, in 2017. A short stretch of the A90 connects the two parts of M90: the short M90 section from the M9 and the much longer M90 section that crosses the Queensferry Crossing and extends to Perth. This short length of the A90 was required at this point as motorway regulations would have prevented certain classes of traffic from using this section of road.

Details

The M90 leaves the east-west M9 near Kirkliston and heads north. The motorway is interrupted by a short stretch of the A90 from where the A90 from Edinburgh joins the M90. The road continues, however the M90 during this stretch is called the A90. Once it reaches the junction to the south of the Queensferry Crossing the A90 becomes the M90 again at that point.

Previously, the M90's most substantial engineering feature was the Friarton Bridge in Perth, a tall concrete pillared structure which traverses the River Tay. The bridge carries eastbound traffic from Broxden towards Dundee and along the Firth of Tay.

The road constitutes most of the southerly part of the A90 corridor from Edinburgh, through Perth, Dundee and Aberdeen to Peterhead along Scotland's North Sea coast.

A large part of the northern section of the motorway follows the route of the former main railway line between Perth and Edinburgh via Glenfarg, Kinross and the Forth Bridge, which was closed in 1970 despite this not being recommended by the Beeching report.

The Kinross and Milnathort Bypass, the  section of the M90 between Fruix and Arlary, was the first motorway in Britain to be constructed using concrete pavements that were not reinforced. Both the south- and north-bound carriageways have since been overlaid by tarmac.

Near to its northern terminus, the motorway splits into two branches. One branch heads in a north-easterly direction, flowing into the A90 at its end, numbered junction 11this branch was formerly the M85 motorway, until the A85 was renumbered as A90. The other branch forms part of the western bypass of Perth, and meets the A9 at its end, numbered junction 12. The gradient is 4.57% uphill and 5.65% downhill on this section. The slip roads forming this branch merge with shared priority to allow HGVs (also known as Large Good Vehicles or Heavy Goods Vehicles) to maintain momentum on the steep upgrade.

The M90 forms part of the Euroroute E15 which runs from Inverness to Algeciras, but which is not signposted within the UK.

Issues
The M90 lacks hard shoulders for an  section. In this section there are emergency lay-bys (rest areas) at  intervals instead.

The M90 here has another of the tightest corners on the UK motorway network, for which some traffic can be forced to slow down. This corner also coincides with one of the steepest sections of the motorway, for which north-bound HGVs are sign-posted to stay in a low gear and often brake continuously through the turn. South-bound HGVs are normally substantially reduced in speed as they make the incline.

Junctions  
{| class="plainrowheaders wikitable"
|-
!scope=col|County
!scope=col|Location
!scope=col|mi
!scope=col|km
!scope=col|Junction
!scope=col|Destinations
!scope=col|Notes
|-
|rowspan="3"|Edinburgh
|—
|0
|0
|—
| – Edinburgh, Stirling
|
|-
|rowspan="3"|Queensferry
|2.6
|4.1
| bgcolor="ffdddd" |1
| bgcolor="ffdddd" | – Edinburgh
| bgcolor="ffdddd" |no Eastbound exit or Southbound entrance
|-
|4.0
|6.5
|1a
| – Queensferry, Newton
|
|-
|rowspan="6"|Fife
|6.7
|10.8
|1b Ferrytoll 
| – QueensferryB981- Inverkeithing, Rosyth Dockyard
|
|-
|rowspan="2"|Rosyth
|7.7
|12.4
|1c
| – Rosyth, KincardineB921- Hillend, Kirkaldy
|
|-
|8.2
|13.2
|2
| A823(M)– Rosyth, Dunfermline
|
|-
|rowspan="2"|Dunfermline
|10.6
|17.1
| bgcolor="ffdddd" |2a Crossgates 
| bgcolor="ffdddd" | – Glenrothes
| bgcolor="ffdddd" |no Northbound entrance or Southbound exit
|-
|11.3
|18.2
|3 Halbeath 
| – Glenrothes - Dunfermline
|
|-
|rowspan="2"|—
|14.9
|23.9
|4
|B914- Kelty
|
|-
|rowspan="8"|Perth and Kinross
|17.6
|28.3
|5
|B9097- Crook of Devon
|
|-
|rowspan="3"|Kinross
|20.7
|33.3
|6
| – Kinross, Crook of Devon
|
|-
|21.9
|35.2
| bgcolor="ffdddd" |7
| bgcolor="ffdddd" | – Milnathort, Stirling
| bgcolor="ffdddd" |no Southbound entrance or Northbound exit
|-
|24.1
|38.8
| bgcolor="ffdddd" |8
| bgcolor="ffdddd" | – St Andrews
| bgcolor="ffdddd" |no Northbound entrance or Southbound exit
|-
|rowspan="2"|Bridge of Earn
|32.5
|52.3
|9
| – Bridge of Earn, Gateside
|
|-
|34.7
|55.8
| bgcolor="ffdddd" |10
| bgcolor="ffdddd" | - Perth
| bgcolor="ffdddd" |Motorway splits into two, southbound entrance and Northbound exit only for A912
|-
|rowspan="2"|Perth
|36.0
|58.0
|11
| – Dundee – Perth, Oban
|On the Eastern branch after the split
|-
|60.4
|37.5
|12
| - Stirling, Inverness – perth
|On the Western branch after the split

Coordinate list

See also 
 List of motorways in the United Kingdom

References

External links 

Scottish Roads Archive - M90

 CBRD Motorway Database - M90
 The Motorway Archive - M90
 Pathetic Motorways - M90
 Pathetic Motorways - M85
 Diagram of Fife M90 Approaches to Queensferry Crossing 

Motorways in Scotland
Transport in Fife
Transport in Perth and Kinross